Harborne Reserve is a nature reserve in Harborne, Birmingham, England, operated by the West Midland Bird Club. Entry is by permit only, except on advertised open days.

The reserve comprises two parts which total  of disused allotments, leased from Birmingham City Council. It is located approximately three miles from Birmingham city centre, alongside the Harborne Walkway.

The reserve is bisected by the Chad Brook.

External links 
 Harborne Nature Reserve

Nature reserves in Birmingham, West Midlands
Harborne